Brigadoon State Nature Preserve is a state nature preserve located in Barren County, Kentucky adjacent to Barren River Lake.

The Office of Kentucky Nature Preserves purchased  of mostly mature forest from the Nature Conservancy that was dedicated into the preserve system on March 14, 1985. An additional  were dedicated on June 12, 2001.

The forest is dominated by American beech, maple, and tulip poplar, with an array of spring wildflowers, including several species that are considered rare or uncommon in Kentucky. There is also habitat for numerous migratory and resident birds in the preserve. The preserve is open to the public and includes at  trail.

References

Protected areas of Barren County, Kentucky
Nature reserves in Kentucky
Protected areas established in 1985
1985 establishments in Kentucky